Elysa Ayala (1879–1956) was an Ecuadorian writer and painter.

Biography 
Elysa Ayala was the first woman in Ecuador to write stories about the issues of montubios, poor and simple peasants from the Ecuadorian coast, in her writings, which went far beyond the customs of her time. Despite the sexist and conservative atmosphere in Ecuador during that period, Elysa's early work appeared in magazines of Argentina (Pink Clouds and Revista Argentina), Chile (Events and El Nacional), Uruguay (Forward), Cuba (Hero and Cosmos), United States (America) and Spain (Valencia Voice).

Publications 
I count on you (Guayaquil, 1993)
Anthology of narrators Ecuador (Quito, 1997)
Basic story anthology Ecuador (Quito, 2001)

1879 births
1956 deaths
20th-century Ecuadorian women writers
20th-century Ecuadorian writers
20th-century Ecuadorian painters
20th-century women artists
Ecuadorian women writers
Ecuadorian women painters